The La Pila fountain is a fountain located in the square of Chiapa de Corzo, Chiapas. It was constructed in 1562 in Moorish style, made of brick in the form of a diamond. The structure is attributed to Dominican brother Rodrigo de León. It measures fifty two meters in circumference and twelve meters in height. It has eight arches and a cylindrical tower which occasionally functioned as a watchtower.

References

Fountains in North America
Buildings and structures in Chiapas